Lung is an organ for breathing.

Lung(s) may also refer to:
Lung, Tibet, a village in Tibet
Lung, Nepal, a village in Nepal
Lung (Tibetan Buddhism), a concept in Tibetan Buddhism
Lung (Chinese medicine), a functionally defined organ (zang-fu) in traditional Chinese medicine
 Radical 212 (龍), the Chinese character for "dragon" transliterated as lung in some systems
Long (surname), also transliterated as "Lung"
Lungs (EP), 1982 EP by American post-hardcore band Big Black
Lungs (album), 2009 debut album by Florence and the Machine
Lungs (play), 2011 play written by Duncan Macmillan
"Lungs", a song by Chvrches from their 2013 debut album, The Bones of What You Believe
"Lungs", a song by Allday released in 2019
"The Lung", a song by Dinosaur Jr. from You're Living All Over Me, 1987
Lungs, County Tyrone, a townland in County Tyrone, Northern Ireland

Surname 

 Carole Frances Lung (born 1966), an American artist and labor activist, known for her performance art

See also
Breathing set (disambiguation)